Marijan Kristan (16 July 1937 — 12 November 2006) was a Slovenian ice hockey player. He competed in the men's tournament at the 1964 Winter Olympics.

References

1937 births
2006 deaths
Slovenian ice hockey defencemen
Olympic ice hockey players of Yugoslavia
Ice hockey players at the 1964 Winter Olympics
Sportspeople from Jesenice, Jesenice
Yugoslav ice hockey defencemen
HK Acroni Jesenice players